Saghacetus is an extinct genus of basilosaurid early whale, fossils of which have been found in the Upper Eocene (middle Priabonian) Qasr el Sagha Formation, Egypt (paleocoordinates ).

In 1879, German botanist Georg August Schweinfurth spent many years exploring Africa and eventually discovered the first archaeocete whale in Egypt.  He visited Qasr el Sagha in 1884 and 1886 and missed the now famous "Zeuglodon Valley" with a few kilometres.  German palaeontologist Wilhelm Barnim Dames described the material, including a well-preserved dentary which is the type specimen of Zeuglodon osiris.

This species is distinguished from other members of the subfamily Dorudontinae by its smaller size and the slightly elongated proximal lumbar and caudal vertebrae.

It was smaller than its contemporary Stromerius, both of which are smaller than the older Dorudon.

Notes

References

 
 
  (plates)
 
 
 
 

Basilosauridae
Prehistoric cetacean genera
Fossil taxa described in 1992
Eocene mammals of Africa